Dick Charles (born Richard Charles Krieg; February 24, 1919 in Newark, New Jersey – July 17, 1998) was an American songwriter.

Career 
His education ended with high school graduation, after which he worked in a Newark photography store as a clerk while engaged in piano playing, arranging, harmony, and composition. During that period he sang in a number of amateur contests. He then became a page at NBC Studios in New York City. Besides being a songwriter, he served as a director of ABC Radio for ten years, produced and directed the Paul Whiteman radio program, and was responsible for creating a number of network programs. In 1954 he started his own recording service.

Selected works 
Among the songs he has written are:
"As the World Turns" (1961) with Fay Tishman - used for one season as the theme song for the TV show As the World Turns
"Along the Navajo Trail" (1945) with Larry Markes and Edgar De Lange
"Casanova Cricket " (1947) with Hoagy Carmichael and Larry Markes
"Corns For My Country" (1944) with Leah Worth and Jean Barry
"I'm on the Level With You " (1945) with Eddie Waldman
"I Tipped My Hat and Slowly Walked Away" (1946) with Larry Markes
"It Takes a Long, Long Train (With a Red Caboose" (1946) with Larry Markes
"Mad About Him, Sad About Him, How Can I Be Glad About Him Blues" (1942) with Larry Markes
"The Man on the Carousel" (Unknown year) with James Cavanaugh, Jack Allison and Virgil Davis
"May You Always" (1957) with Larry Markes
"A Nightingale Can Sing the Blues" (1946) with Larry Markes
"This Is My Song" (1950) - Theme song of the TV show The Patti Page Show
 "Serenade to Spring," with Gloria Regney (1954)
 "If Anything Should Happen to You," w&m co-written with Fred Ebb (1955);

References

1919 births
1998 deaths
Record producers from New Jersey
Musicians from Newark, New Jersey
Songwriters from New Jersey
20th-century American musicians
20th-century American businesspeople